The 2001 Cincinnati Bengals season was the franchise’s 34th year in professional football and its 32nd with the National Football League. In the first full season with Dick LeBeau as head coach, the Bengals abandoned their plans for developing quarterback Akili Smith as their starter by acquiring Jon Kitna from the Seattle Seahawks. The Bengals would win their first two games with Kitna behind center, and sat at 4–3 through the first seven games of the season. However, the Bengals would struggle again, losing their next seven games as Kitna struggled with inconsistency, throwing 22 interceptions while throwing only 12 touchdown passes. The Bengals would win their final two games to close the season with a 6–10 record, their eleventh consecutive season without a winning record. Despite the team’s struggles, All-Pro running back Corey Dillon had another stellar year, rushing for 1,315 yards.

2001 would turn out to be an important year for the team, as players such as Justin Smith, Chad Johnson, Rudi Johnson, and T. J. Houshmandzadeh were drafted, all those players would be important to Cincinnati in later years. One bright spot for the Bengals that year was the defeated the eventual Super Bowl champion New England Patriots in the season opener.

Offseason

NFL Draft

Personnel

Roster

Regular season

Schedule

Standings

Team leaders

Passing

Rushing

Receiving

Defensive

Kicking and punting

Special teams

Awards and records 
 Corey Dillon, 5th 1,000 yard rushing season

References

External links 
 
 2001 Cincinnati Bengals at Pro-Football-Reference.com

Cincinnati Bengals
Cincinnati Bengals seasons
Cincin